John William Williams (6 April 1827 – 27 April 1904) was a 19th-century Member of Parliament from Northland, New Zealand.

Williams was born in Paihia on 6 April 1827. He was one of the sons of Marianne Williams and the pioneering New Zealand missionary Archdeacon Henry Williams.

Williams was elected to represent the Bay of Islands electorate in the Auckland Provincial Council from 23 Jan 1863 to 13 Sep 1865.

He married Sarah Busby (1835–1913), daughter of James Busby. They had 11 children including the politician Kenneth Williams, and the lawyer and cricket administrator Heathcote Williams.

He died at his residence in Napier's Cameron Road on 27 April 1904.

References

1827 births
1904 deaths
Members of the New Zealand House of Representatives
Unsuccessful candidates in the 1879 New Zealand general election
New Zealand MPs for North Island electorates
19th-century New Zealand politicians
People from the Bay of Islands